Atapana Siakimotu  (born ) is a Niuean politician, diplomat, and public servant. He served as the speaker of the Niuean Assembly between 2002 and 2011.

Biography 
Siakimotu was educated at Lincoln College in New Zealand, graduating with a diploma in horticulture. He previously worked as principal of Niue High School, director of education, and as consul-general to New Zealand. 

He was appointed speaker of the assembly after the 2002 election, and was re-appointed in 2005 and 2008.

In April 2011, he announced that he would retire at the 2011 election, after serving nine years as speaker. He later served as chair of the Niue Public Service Commission.

Siakimotu contested the seat of Avatele in the 2020 Niuean general election, but was unsuccessful, losing to Poimamao Vakanofiti.

At the 2022 Niue National Awards he was awarded the Niue Public Service Medal.

References

Living people
Speakers of the Niue Assembly
Members of the Niue Assembly
Niuean diplomats
1948 births
Lincoln University (New Zealand) alumni